Surinder Singh Bhulewal Rathan is an Indian politician from the state of Punjab.  Rathan was a member of the Punjab Legislative Assembly from 2012 to 2017 representing Garhshankar Assembly Constituency .
He was defeated by Jai Krishan Singh.

Election results

2017

References 

Punjab, India MLAs 2012–2017
Year of birth missing (living people)
Living people